Suren Bardughi Aghababyan (born 22 January 1922, Karaklis – died 19 March 1986) was a Soviet Armenian literary critic and Doctor of Philology.

He was an author of many works including biographies of Yeghishe Charents and Axel Bakunts, and the History of Soviet Armenian Literature (two volumes, 1961–65, published in Russian in 1966).

References 

1922 births
1986 deaths
People from Vanadzor
Armenian literary critics
Armenian male writers
Armenian scientists
Soviet scientists
Soviet writers